Refund.me, stylized as refund.me is a technology-driven company that provides legal services for air passengers whose flight has been cancelled, significantly delayed or overbooked and for missed connections. It does so according to the stipulations of European passenger rights legislation, specifically EU Regulation 261/2004. Refund.me operates on a no-win, no-fee contingency fee.

History 

Refund.me was founded in 2012 by Eve Büchner, a former journalist, host and contributor on German news channel N24. She continues to act as CEO to date. The company has a stated goal of making passenger rights according to EC 261/2004 more transparent and attainable.

Refund.me has a team of over 40 people, including development, claims processing, legal, communications and customer relations. It is privately owned.

In its first nine months, Refund.me processed claims from 122 airlines for passengers in more than 50 countries spanning five continents. Refund.me is also reported to have processed claims from 419 airports.
According to the Refund.me website, it has cases from more than 110 countries and against more than 250 airlines. Service was introduced in English and German in July 2012, rolling out a free iOS and Android app. Since then, the company has added French, Spanish, Polish and Portuguese to its website, app and services.

Service 

Refund.me offers a widget on its website where users can submit their claim. The service is also available via Refund.me’s mobile apps for iOS and Android.

Refund.me operates according to a 25% contingent fee, marketed as “no win, no fee”. It has recorded a success rate of 93.71%.
According to its website, Refund.me also offers B2B partnerships by lending out its widget to partners or affiliates. Refund.me claims its Advanced Business Logic technology, which it has developed itself, considers current legislation and court rulings to quickly assess a claim’s eligibility. Passengers can consult the company’s website or its mobile app to submit their claims.

Legal Basis 

Refund.me is not a law firm, but is legally permitted to negotiate with airlines on behalf of customers that have signed a Power of Attorney in their favor. Though Refund.me is not a law firm, it collaborates with several law firms across Europe.
According to European  Regulation 261/2004, passengers are eligible for compensation payments of €250 to €600 depending on the length of the delay on arrival and the distance traveled.

Awards 

In May 2013 Refund.me was awarded the Sabre Red Appy Award by the Sabre Travel Network in recognition of its business model and its app that makes it easier for agents and travelers to claim compensation from airlines. In October 2013 Refund.me was named Startup 2013 at the Appsters Awards in London. This prize was awarded based on the jury’s vote and a popular vote by the audience. Additionally, Refund.me was named finalist in the Best Consumer App Category.

Refund.me was commended by the 2014 FT Innovative Lawyers Report in the Legal Industry Pioneers category.

See also 
AirHelp
Flight cancellation and delay

References

External links 
 Official Website

German companies established in 2012
Technology companies of Germany
Companies based in Potsdam